Code page 775 (CCSID 775) (also known as CP 775, IBM 00775, and OEM 775, MS-DOS Baltic Rim) is a code page used under DOS to write the Estonian, Lithuanian and Latvian languages. In Lithuania, this code page is standardised as LST 1590-1, alongside the related Code page 778 (LST 1590-2).

It is possible, but unusual, to write Polish, Swedish, Finnish, Norwegian, Danish and German using this code page due to it including all the characters in ISO 8859-13. The other code page used for Baltic languages is Windows-1257.

Character set
The following table shows code page 775. Each character is shown with its equivalent Unicode code point. Only the second half of the table (code points 128–255) is shown, the first half (code points 0–127) being the same as code page 437.

References

775